Douglassia bealiana, common name Beal's drillia, is a species of sea snail, a marine gastropod mollusk in the family Drilliidae.

This species was renamed Drillia bealiana by E.C. Rios in 1994.

Description
The size of an adult shell varies between 8 mm and 12 mm.

Distribution
This species occurs in the demersal zone of the Atlantic Ocean from Florida to North Brasil at depths between 26 m and 91 m.

References

 Rosenberg, G., F. Moretzsohn, and E. F. García. 2009. Gastropoda (Mollusca) of the Gulf of Mexico, Pp. 579–699 in Felder, D.L. and D.K. Camp (eds.), Gulf of Mexico–Origins, Waters, and Biota. Biodiversity. Texas A&M Press, College Station, Texas
 Tucker, J.K. 2004 Catalog of recent and fossil turrids (Mollusca: Gastropoda). Zootaxa 682:1–1295.
 Fallon P.J. (2016). Taxonomic review of tropical western Atlantic shallow water Drilliidae (Mollusca: Gastropoda: Conoidea) including descriptions of 100 new species. Zootaxa. 4090(1): 1–363

External links
 

bealiana
Gastropods described in 1942